Gandhi Memorial Intercontinental School (GMIS), formerly Gandhi Memorial International School, is a private international school in Kemayoran, Jakarta, Indonesia. It was established in 1950 along with Gandhi School Ancol. The students of grades preschool to 12 relocated to a new campus in Kemayoran (Central Jakarta) in 2004.

GMIS is a hub for over 2000 students from around the globe from more than 50 countries. The student population is largely Indonesian, Indian, Korean, and Chinese. GMIS was one of the first schools in Indonesia to gain the IB world school status.

The school offers its students learning options from PYP, MYP, IGCSE, Science and Commerce, and the Full International Baccalaureate (IB) Diploma, (IB) course related program and (IB) Careers program. The IB CP program contains an additional accounting class on top of the other IB DP subject the school teaches. GMIS follows the IB curriculum as well as the Indian Matriculation Board of Secondary Education.

The school changed its name to Gandhi Memorial Intercontinental School from Gandhi Memorial International School in 2015 to comply with the Indonesian government's regulations on prohibiting the use of the word "international" in school names.

Affiliations and accreditations 
The school is accredited by the University of Cambridge Local Examinations Syndicate (IGCSE, O Level, and A Level Examinations); the Board of Secondary Education Indian Schools, Indonesia; the Association of Indian Universities; the Australian Music Examinations Board, Melbourne; the University of Delhi; and the University of Mumbai. GMIS is also an IB world school, certified in being a test location for the IB Diploma, as well as the IB Careers Program. Many university representatives visit the school on random dates to share information about the courses they provide and the application process.

Facilities 

Gandhi Memorial Intercontinental School consists of two buildings: a main building with six floors and four wings, and a second building for additional classrooms and administrative offices. 

Facilities include classrooms on each floor, an indoor assembly area, a canteen, a library, science laboratories, computer laboratories, a seminar room, a seated auditorium, a gymnasium, a sports field, a swimming pool, a playground, and a clinic. The school provides free Wi-Fi access for registered students.

The second building is used for classes and International General Certificate of Secondary Education examinations.

Notable alumni 
 Nadine Ames, crowned Puteri Indonesia 2010 contest and represented Indonesia in the Miss Universe 2011

References

External links 
 
 GMIS profile at International Baccalaureate

Cambridge schools in Indonesia
International Baccalaureate schools in Indonesia
International schools in Indonesia
Schools in Jakarta
Educational institutions established in 1950
1950 establishments in Indonesia